Joseph J. Carraro is an American politician. He represented District 26 in the New Mexico State Senate from 1985 to 1989. After the 1990 redistricting of the New Mexico Legislature, his neighborhood was in another district. He was elected to represent the 23rd district in 1993, and served in that capacity until 2009. He was formerly a member of the Republican party until he became an independent in 2008.

Early life and education 
Carraro was born in New York City, New York State, in 1944. He attended the University of New Mexico, where he received a Bachelor of Arts degree and an MBA.

He worked as a financial analyst and stock broker at Merrill Lynch from 1970 to 1974.

Career 
Carraro ran for the Republican nomination for the 2006 United States Senate election in New Mexico. He came in 2nd place with 31% of the vote.

In 2012, Carraro used the slogan "The Average Joe" in an unsuccessful campaign against John Ryan in a bid for a New Mexico Senate seat.

References

External links

Living people
1944 births
American people of Italian descent
New Mexico state senators
20th-century American politicians
21st-century American politicians